Kailangan Ko'y Ikaw (International title: All for Love / ) is a 2013 Philippines drama television series starring Anne Curtis, Kris Aquino and Robin Padilla. The series aired on ABS-CBN Primetime Bida evening block from January 21, 2013, to April 19, 2013, replacing A Beautiful Affair.

Plot
Kailangan Ko’y Ikaw follows the story of Police Inspector Gregorio Dagohoy (Robin Padilla), a police investigator who accidentally meets the Manrique sisters; Ruth (Anne Curtis) and Roxanne (Kris Aquino) because of kidnapping incident. It happens that Ruth planned her own kidnapping and wanted to extort money from her family. Despite of her being the black sheep in the family and pushing her passion to be a model, her sister Roxanne remained faithful to her. Gregorio became close to the two sisters that has a connection to a crime that his father became involved despite of his innocence.

Cast and characters

Main cast
Anne Curtis as Ruth Manrique
Kris Aquino as Roxanne Manrique-Dagohoy
Robin Padilla as Gregorio "Bogs" Dagohoy

Supporting cast
Xyriel Manabat as Cherish Dagohoy
Tirso Cruz III as Rodrigo Manrique
Gloria Sevilla as Esther Dagohoy
Ian Veneracion as Redentor "Red" Manrique
Karla Estrada as Apple Puno
Miles Ocampo as Precious Dagohoy
Marco Gumabao as Ian Velasquez

Guest cast
Melissa Mendez as Dina Manrique
Kevin Viard as Gunther Armansi
Tetchie Agbayani as Luisa
Efren Reyes as Ernesto Cruz
Jeffrey Santos as Popoy Almonte
Diane Medina as Sonia
Troy Montero as Aldrich Matias
Guji Lorenzana as Mario
Nick Lizaso as Menandro Matias
Pocholo Montes as Simon
Matthew Padilla as Lawin 
Paolo Serrano as Mark
Johnny Revilla as Don Leo
Laureen Uy as Esmy
Smokey Manaloto as Pogi Kho
Emilio Garcia as Loro

Special participation
Lito Pimentel as Nestor Dagohoy
Daniel Padilla as young Bogs
Trina Legaspi as young Roxanne
Alexandra Macanan as young Ruth
Carlo Lacana as teen Red

See also
List of programs broadcast by ABS-CBN
List of telenovelas of ABS-CBN

References

2013 Philippine television series debuts
2013 Philippine television series endings
Philippine action television series
Police procedural television series
Law enforcement in fiction
Philippine melodrama television series
ABS-CBN drama series
Television series by Dreamscape Entertainment Television
Philippine romance television series
Filipino-language television shows
Television shows set in the Philippines